Relations exist and have existed between Austria and Turkey and their predecessor states, the Habsburg monarchy and Ottoman Empire respectively. The countries (in their predecessor forms) fought as allies during the First World War. The countries have since had normal relations, however Austrian opposition to the Accession of Turkey to the European Union has become a point of tension.
Turkey is a member of NATO. Austria is also not a member of NATO.

The Habsburgs and the Ottomans 

From the middle ages until the twentieth century, today's Austria and Turkey were the core regions within much larger empires. Austria was the seat of the House of Habsburg and Turkey was ruled by the House of Osman (also known as the Ottoman Dynasty). The Habsburg and Ottoman states were both large multi-ethnic conglomerations sustained by conquest. These rival empires waged frequent wars against each other over control of much Central Europe and the Balkans.

During its peak, the Ottoman Empire threatened to conquer the Austrian capital of Vienna twice: in 1529 and 1683. After the second Ottoman defeat at Vienna and the end of the Great Turkish War in 1699, however, the Habsburgs gained the upper hand, and captured Hungary and Croatia from the Ottomans. After these gains, Austria was no longer able to advance into the Balkans, because of the rival influence of Russia, in a stalemate and dispute known as the Eastern Question. While Ottoman control in the Balkans declined, the Austrians were not able to annex any new territory until Bosnia in 1908, and even that caused a diplomatic crisis (the Bosnian crisis). In the interim, Russia had helped several nationalities in the Balkans to rebel against the Ottomans and create separate nation-states in the Balkans. After the culmination of all the changes from the Greek War of Independence (1821–1829) to the Balkan Wars (1912–1913) the Austrian and Ottoman empires no longer bordered each other. This allowed both to join the Central Powers as allies during the First World War. The defeat of the Central Powers led to the overthrow of both monarchies.

Austrian and Turkish republics 
Austria currently has normal relations with Turkey. However, there are some minor complications. Austria, which has approximately 250,000 Turks living there (about 3% of Austria's population), has been at the forefront of blocking Turkey's accession to the European Union.

Accession of Turkey to the European Union
On 10 November 2010 relations between the two countries were excessively tensed after the Turkish ambassador to Austria accused the Austrian public and political elite of xenophobia and called on international organisations with buildings in Vienna to relocate to another country. The Freedom Party called for the suspension of diplomatic relations and for stopping EU accession talks with Ankara.

In December 2017, Turkey accused the incoming Austrian government of discrimination and racism, after it would not agree to Ankara joining the EU. In addition, Turkey slammed the EU for not condemning the Austrian government's approach. Also, the Turkish foreign ministry accused the incoming government of “dishonesty,” and warned that their approach would bring Austria “to the brink of losing Turkey’s friendship” and be met with “the reaction that it deserves.”

Diplomacy

Republic of Austria
Ankara (Embassy)
Istanbul (Consulate-General)

Republic of Turkey
Vienna (Embassy)
Bregenz (Consulate-General)
Salzburg (Consulate-General)

Embassies 
The Embassy of Austria is located in Ankara, Turkey. The Embassy of Turkey is located in Vienna, Austria.

See also 
 Foreign relations of Austria
 Foreign relations of Turkey 
 Armenian genocide denial 
 EU–Turkey relations
 
 Austrians in Turkey 
 Austrians in Middle East 
 Islam in Austria
 Turks in Austria 
 Turks in Europe

References

External links 
 Turkish Ministry of Foreign Affairs about the relations with Austria

 
Bilateral relations of Turkey
Turkey